Album of History was a Canadian historical television miniseries which aired on CBC Television in 1967.

Premise
This seven-episode series featured photographs from historical archives throughout Canada. Subjects included British Columbia's history, the First Nations of western Canada, the North-West Rebellion, the construction of the Canadian Pacific Railway, prairie immigrants, cowboys and the development of western communities.

Production
Music was under the direction of Ricky Hyslop. Special research was conducted by Lester Machan. Series writer Tommy Tweed narrated all episodes except the last in which Gordie Tapp provided the voiceover.

Scheduling
The half-hour episodes aired on Fridays at 8:00 p.m. (Eastern) from 23 June to 11 August 1967.

References

External links
 

CBC Television original programming
1967 Canadian television series debuts
1967 Canadian television series endings